William K. Coon (March 21, 1855 – August 30, 1915) was a Major League Baseball player.

Coon played 30 games at Outfield, 22 games as a Catcher. 4 games as a Second Baseman and Third baseman, and 2 games a pitcher.

He was born in Pennsylvania and died in Burlington, New Jersey.

External links

Major League Baseball catchers
Major League Baseball right fielders
Philadelphia Athletics (NA) players
Philadelphia Athletics (NL) players
Baseball players from Philadelphia
1855 births
1915 deaths
19th-century baseball players
Philadelphia Athletic players
Rockford White Stockings players
Trenton (minor league baseball) players